The All-Ireland Senior Hurling Championship of 1985 was the 99th edition of Ireland's premier hurling knockout competition.  The championship ran from May to September of that year, culminating with the All-Ireland final, held at Croke Park, Dublin on 1 September.  The match was contested by Offaly and Galway, with Offaly taking the title by 2–11 to 1–12.  It was Offaly's second-ever All-Ireland title.

Format

The All-Ireland Senior Hurling Championship was run on a provincial basis as usual.  All games were played on a knockout basis whereby once a team lost they were eliminated from the championship.  The format for the All-Ireland series of games ran as follows: 
 The winners of the Munster Championship advanced directly to the first All-Ireland semi-final.  
 The winners of the Leinster Championship advanced directly to the second All-Ireland semi-final.  
 Galway, a team who faced no competition in the Connacht Championship, entered the championship at the All-Ireland semi-final stage where they played the Munster champions.
 The winners of the Ulster Championship advanced directly to a lone All-Ireland quarter-final where they played the winners of the All-Ireland 'B' championship.  The winners of this game advanced to the All-Ireland semi-final where they played the Leinster champions.

Fixtures

Leinster Senior Hurling Championship

Munster Senior Hurling Championship

All-Ireland Senior Hurling Championship

Championship statistics

Miscellaneous

 Laois qualified for the Leinster final for the first time since 1951.
 In the All-Ireland semi-final, Galway defeated Cork for only the third time in the history of the championship.  Previous victories for the Galway men came in the All-Ireland semi-finals of 1975 and 1979.

Top scorers

Season

Single game

References

 Corry, Eoghan, The GAA Book of Lists (Hodder Headline Ireland, 2005).
 Donegan, Des, The Complete Handbook of Gaelic Games (DBA Publications Limited, 2005).

See also

1985
All-Ireland Senior Hurling Championship